The 1977 Tasmanian Australian National Football League (TANFL) premiership season was an Australian rules football competition staged in Hobart, Tasmania over fifteen (15) roster rounds and four (4) finals series matches between 16 April and 10 September 1977.

Participating Clubs
Clarence District Football Club
Glenorchy District Football Club
Hobart Football Club
New Norfolk District Football Club
North Hobart Football Club
Sandy Bay Football Club

1977 TANFL Club Coaches
Robin Norris (Clarence)
Jack Rough (Glenorchy)
Barry Grinter (Hobart)
Peter Chisnall (New Norfolk)
Ian Bremner (North Hobart)
Paul Sproule (Sandy Bay)

TANFL Reserves Grand Final
 Glenorchy 12.17 (89) v New Norfolk 9.15 (69) – North Hobart Oval

TANFL Under-19's Grand Final
 Not Available.

Interstate Matches
Ardath Cup (Tuesday, 26 April 1977) 
South Fremantle 13.14 (92) v Tasmania 13.11 (89) – Att: N/A at Norwood Oval, Adelaide

Interstate Match (Sunday, 12 June 1977)
Victoria 24.28 (172) v Tasmania 9.9 (63) – Att: 10,369 at North Hobart Oval

Intrastate Matches
Jubilee Shield (Saturday, 14 May 1977)
TANFL 18.17 (125) v NWFU 16.17 (113) – Att: 4,378 at North Hobart Oval

Jubilee Shield (Saturday, 21 May 1977)
NWFU 21.15 (141) v TANFL 15.8 (98) – Att: 3,536 at Devonport Oval

Inter-Association Match (Saturday, 7 May 1977)
TANFL 29.29 (203) v WTFA 5.7 (37) – Att: 3,387 at North Hobart Oval

Leading Goalkickers: TANFL
Col Smith (Hobart) – 49
John Hollis (Sandy Bay) – 42
Roland Curley (Glenorchy) – 34
Don McLeod (Nth Hobart) – 28

Medal Winners
Michael Hawkins (Nth Hobart) – William Leitch Medal
R.Murley (New Norfolk) – George Watt Medal (Reserves)
Dan Munnings (New Norfolk) – V.A Geard Medal (Under-19's)
David Jones (Sandy Bay) – Weller Arnold Medal (Best TANFL player in Intrastate Matches)

1977 TANFL Ladder

Round 1
(Saturday, 16 April 1977)
New Norfolk 13.11 (89) v Nth Hobart 11.15 (81) – Att: 2,486 at North Hobart Oval
Sandy Bay 12.18 (90) v Hobart 7.8 (50) – Att: 1,150 at TCA Ground
Glenorchy 9.16 (70) v Clarence 9.9 (63) – Att: 1,675 at Bellerive Oval

Round 2
(Saturday, 23 April & Monday, 25 April 1977)
Nth Hobart 15.13 (103) v Clarence 4.12 (36) – Att: 2,859 at North Hobart Oval
Glenorchy 15.6 (96) v Hobart 13.10 (88) – Att: 1,950 at KGV Football Park
Sandy Bay 19.18 (132) v New Norfolk 12.14 (86) – Att: 3,173 at North Hobart Oval (Monday)

Round 3
(Saturday, 30 April 1977)
Hobart 18.21 (129) v Clarence 13.12 (90) – Att: 1,563 at North Hobart Oval
Sandy Bay 12.8 (80) v Nth Hobart 8.17 (65) – Att: 2,008 at Queenborough Oval
Glenorchy 18.13 (121) v New Norfolk 8.13 (61) – Att: 1,855 at Boyer Oval

Round 4
(Saturday, 21 May 1977)
New Norfolk 17.8 (110) v Hobart 15.19 (109) – Att: 1,341 at North Hobart Oval
Sandy Bay 12.14 (86) v Clarence 10.19 (79) – Att: 1,332 at Queenborough Oval
Glenorchy 14.10 (94) v Nth Hobart 10.6 (66) – Att: 2,036 at KGV Football Park

Round 5
(Saturday, 28 May 1977)
Sandy Bay 19.10 (124) v Glenorchy 6.10 (46) – Att: 3,182 at North Hobart Oval
Hobart 11.13 (79) v Nth Hobart 8.18 (66) – Att: 1,196 at TCA Ground
New Norfolk 11.7 (73) v Clarence 10.11 (71) – Att: 1,252 at Bellerive Oval

Round 6
(Saturday, 4 June 1977)
Glenorchy 23.13 (151) v Clarence 9.13 (67) – Att: 2,095 at North Hobart Oval
Sandy Bay 21.10 (136) v Hobart 10.8 (68) – Att: 1,652 at Queenborough Oval
New Norfolk 24.13 (157) v Nth Hobart 13.6 (84) – Att: 1,402 at Boyer Oval

Round 7
(Saturday, 11 June 1977)
Clarence 11.15 (81) v Nth Hobart 8.8 (56) – Att: 1,542 at North Hobart Oval
Sandy Bay 13.10 (88) v New Norfolk 7.16 (58) – Att: 1,561 at Queenborough Oval
Glenorchy 15.14 (104) v Hobart 9.12 (66) – Att: 1,695 at KGV Football Park

Round 8
(Saturday, 18 June 1977)
Sandy Bay 14.20 (104) v Nth Hobart 12.11 (83) – Att: 1,673 at North Hobart Oval
New Norfolk 13.14 (92) v Glenorchy 13.7 (85) – Att: 1,866 at KGV Football Park
Clarence 9.21 (75) v Hobart 9.11 (65) – Att: 1,394 at Bellerive Oval

Round 9
(Saturday, 25 June 1977)
Glenorchy 6.21 (57) v Nth Hobart 7.10 (52) – Att: 2,138 at North Hobart Oval
Sandy Bay 20.18 (138) v Clarence 7.12 (54) – Att: 1,272 at Bellerive Oval
New Norfolk 18.8 (116) v Hobart 9.14 (68) – Att: 1,191 at Boyer Oval

Round 10
(Saturday, 2 July 1977)
Nth Hobart 17.11 (113) v Hobart 13.13 (91) – Att: 1,368 at TCA Ground
Sandy Bay 12.15 (87) v Glenorchy 8.12 (60) – Att: 2,089 at Queenborough Oval
New Norfolk 16.13 (109) v Clarence 9.10 (64) – Att: 1,391 at KGV Football Park

Round 11
(Saturday, 9 July 1977)
Sandy Bay 12.21 (93) v Hobart 13.9 (87) – Att: 1,621 at North Hobart Oval
Glenorchy 16.13 (109) v Clarence 11.10 (76) – Att: 1,607 at KGV Football Park
New Norfolk 10.12 (72) v Nth Hobart 7.11 (53) – Att: 1,773 at Boyer Oval

Round 12
(Saturday, 16 July 1977)
Glenorchy 15.16 (106) v Hobart 5.8 (38) – Att: 2,087 at North Hobart Oval
Nth Hobart 13.9 (87) v Clarence 9.6 (60) – Att: 1,433 at Bellerive Oval
Sandy Bay 10.20 (80) v New Norfolk 7.10 (52) – Att: 2,040 at Boyer Oval

Round 13
(Saturday, 23 July & Saturday, 30 July 1977)
New Norfolk 17.7 (109) v Glenorchy 13.15 (93) – Att: 2,749 at North Hobart Oval (23 July)
Hobart 16.14 (110) v Clarence 6.12 (48) – Att: 964 at TCA Ground (23 July)
Sandy Bay 16.25 (121) v Nth Hobart 6.8 (44) – Att: 2,675 at North Hobart Oval (30 July)

Round 14
(Saturday, 6 August 1977)
Sandy Bay 18.19 (127) v Clarence 5.8 (38) – Att: 1,251 at North Hobart Oval
New Norfolk 28.10 (178) v Hobart 13.17 (95) – Att: 1,356 at TCA Ground
Nth Hobart 16.9 (105) v Glenorchy 12.21 (93) – Att: 1,818 at KGV Football Park

Round 15
(Saturday, 13 August 1977)
Nth Hobart 13.19 (97) v Hobart 14.12 (96) – Att: 1,816 at North Hobart Oval
Glenorchy 12.17 (89) v Sandy Bay 11.17 (83) – Att: 1,964 at KGV Football Park
New Norfolk 10.11 (71) v Clarence 8.6 (54) – Att: 1,176 at Boyer Oval

First Semi Final
(Saturday, 20 August 1977)
Glenorchy: 3.9 (27) | 8.12 (60) | 11.17 (83) | 13.22 (100)
Nth Hobart: 4.2 (26) | 6.3 (39) | 11.5 (71) | 13.8 (86)
Attendance: 4,825 at North Hobart Oval

Second Semi Final
(Saturday, 27 August 1977)
Sandy Bay: 3.3 (21) | 8.6 (54) | 15.9 (99) | 18.10 (118)
New Norfolk: 5.3 (33) | 9.5 (59) | 15.5 (95) | 16.10 (106)
Attendance: 7,931 at North Hobart Oval

Preliminary Final
(Saturday, 3 September 1977)
Glenorchy: 1.4 (10) | 6.9 (45) | 10.11 (71) | 14.16 (100)
New Norfolk: 2.7 (19) | 2.11 (23) | 5.12 (42) | 7.13 (55)
Attendance: 5,611 at North Hobart Oval

Grand Final
(Saturday, 10 September 1977)
Sandy Bay: 6.5 (41) | 9.5 (59) | 15.7 (97) | 19.9 (123)
Glenorchy: 0.3 (3) | 1.7 (13) | 1.9 (15) | 5.14 (44)
Attendance: 12,960 at North Hobart Oval

Source: All scores and statistics courtesy of the Hobart Mercury and Saturday Evening Mercury (SEM) publications.

Tasmanian Football League seasons